In the 2002–03 season, USM Alger is competing in Division 1 for the 23rd time, as well as the Algerian Cup.  It is their 8th consecutive season in the top flight of Algerian football. They will be competing in Ligue 1, the CAF Champions League, the UAFA Club Cup and the Algerian Cup. In 2002–03 It was the best season in the history of USM Alger and participated in five competitions, The opening season was in the Arab Unified Club Championship, and was eliminated in the group stage, In the Cup Winners' Cup, the red and black reached the semi-finals, and was eliminated against Wydad Casablanca and fails to achieve the first continental title despite the second leg that took place in Algeria Where did USM Alger need to win to qualify for the final. In the Division 1, the journey towards achieving the title was not easy, and the struggle was great with USM Blida, NA Hussein Dey and JS Kabylie, and USM Alger waited until the 28 round to celebrate the title after winning against ASM Oran. To complete the joy in the Algerian Cup by winning the title after the victory against CR Belouizdad after Moncef Ouichaoui scored the golden goal to achieve the double for the first time in its history under the leadership of Azzedine Aït Djoudi. also achieved Ouichaoui top scorer in the league for the first time a player from USM Alger with 18 goals including two hat-tricks. On February 24, 2003, in the derby meeting against CR Belouizdad and in the last minutes while Hichem Mezaïr was heading to fetch the ball, the ball holder attacked him to respond in kind, so the match stopped and the stands turned into an arena of violence between the managers and supporters of the two clubs and despite that, the match was completed with difficulty.

Squad list
Players and squad numbers last updated on 1 September 2002.Note: Flags indicate national team as has been defined under FIFA eligibility rules. Players may hold more than one non-FIFA nationality.

Competitions

Overview

Division 1

League table

Results summary

Results by round

Matches

Algerian Cup

African Cup Winners' Cup

Quarter-finals

Semifinals

Champions League

First round

Second round

Arab Unified Club Championship

Group stage

Squad information

Playing statistics

Appearances (Apps.) numbers are for appearances in competitive games only including sub appearances
Red card numbers denote:   Numbers in parentheses represent red cards overturned for wrongful dismissal.Statistics all except one meeting in the African Cup Winners' Cup and three in the Arab Unified Club Championship.

Goalscorers
Includes all competitive matches. The list is sorted alphabetically by surname when total goals are equal.

Clean sheets
Includes all competitive matches.

Hat-tricks

(H) – Home ; (A) – Away ; (N) – Neutral

Transfers

In

Notes

References

USM Alger seasons
USM Alger